The Zapotec salamander (Bolitoglossa zapoteca) is a species of salamander in the family Plethodontidae.

It is endemic to the eastern Sierra Madre del Sur in Oaxaca, Mexico, where it is known from two locations – near  Quiegolani and on Cerro Piedra Larga, around 1,875 meters elevation. Its extent of occurrence (EOO) is 435 km2.

Its natural habitat is montane pine–oak forest and heavily degraded former forest. It is threatened by habitat loss.

References

Bolitoglossa
Endemic amphibians of Mexico
Fauna of the Sierra Madre del Sur
Taxonomy articles created by Polbot
Amphibians described in 2002